Syringin is a natural chemical compound first isolated from the bark of lilac (Syringa vulgaris) by Meillet in 1841.  It has since been found to be distributed widely throughout many types of plants. It is also called eleutheroside B, and is found in Eleutherococcus senticosus (Siberian ginseng). It is also found in dandelion coffee. Syringin may potentially have antidiabetic effects.

Chemically, it is the glucoside of sinapyl alcohol.

References

External links

Phenylpropanoid glucosides
Hydroxymethyl compounds